Eucarpha is a genus of flowering plant of the family  Proteaceae, endemic to New Caledonia. Two species are recognised. Up to 1975, these were classified within the genus Knightia until Lawrence Johnson and Barbara G. Briggs recognised their distinctness, particularly their prominent bracts, in their 1975 monograph "On the Proteaceae: the evolution and classification of a southern family". Nomenclatural combinations for these two species in the genus Eucarpha were published in 2022. Other sources, including Plants of the World Online , treat Eucarpha as a synonym of Knightia.

In 2006, the genus was placed in the tribe Roupaleae. Its closest relative is the Australian Triunia.

Species
Eucarpha deplanchei (Vieill. ex Brongn. & Gris) P.H.Weston & Mabb., syn. Knightia deplanchei Vieill. ex Brongn. & Gris
Eucarpha strobilina (Labill.) P.H.Weston & Mabb., syn. Knightia strobilina (Labill.) R.Br. ex Meisn.

References

Proteaceae
Proteaceae genera
Endemic flora of New Caledonia